Lembá is a seaside settlement in the Lembá District in the western part of São Tomé Island in São Tomé and Príncipe. Its population is 395 (2012 census). It lies 2.5 km south of Santa Catarina.

Population history

References

Populated places in Lembá District
Populated coastal places in São Tomé and Príncipe